Gehman is a surname. Notable people with the surname include:

Don Gehman, American record producer, best known for his work in the 1980s with John Mellencamp
Harold W. Gehman, Jr., retired United States Navy four-star admiral who served as NATO's Supreme Allied Commander
Hilary Gehman (born 1971), American rower from Shirley, Massachusetts
Martha Gehman, American actress, known for her role as Ophelia in the 1985 cult classic The Legend of Billie Jean
Pleasant Gehman (born 1959), magazine writer, poet, actor, dancer and musician from Los Angeles
Richard Gehman (1921–1972), prolific American author of 3,000 magazine articles, five novels and fifteen nonfiction books

Other 
 John Gehman Farm was listed on the National Register of Historic Places in 1992